Lydden Hill Race Circuit (formerly known as Lydden Circuit) is a motorsport venue in Denton with Wootton, about half-way between Canterbury and Dover in Kent, England. The mile-long circuit is mainly used for Rallycross, Drift, Saloon and Sports car racing as well as Motorcycle racing.

It is the shortest road racing circuit in the United Kingdom. The track was previously owned by the McLaren Group and is one of two motor racing circuits in the county of Kent, along with Brands Hatch.

History 

Lydden was founded in 1955 by Bill Chesson with the help of the Astra Motor Club. From 1957, they promoted stock-car racing and grass-track racing for motorcycles. By 1962, Chesson wanted to progress and laid a tarmac track in order to promote motor and motorcycle road racing. The original plan was for a 1-mile circuit but this scheme had to be put on hold when the tarmac ran out at what is known as the Devil’s Elbow; the result was the short circuit.

In 1965, tarmac asphalt was laid for hosting car racing up to Formula Three. 

On 4 February 1967, the sport of Rallycross was born at Lydden, thought up by TV producer Robert Reed and race organiser Bud Smith in co-operation with Chesson. Combining tarmac and non-tarmac elements, the inaugural race was won by Vic Elford in a Porsche 911. Since 1973, Lydden Circuit has seen rounds of Embassy/ERA European Rallycross Championships and FIA European Championships for Rallycross Drivers, the first 23 were all organised by the Thames Estuary Automobile Club (TEAC). To this day, Lydden, as the so-called "Home of Rallycross", still holds British Rallycross Championship racing.

On 9 September 1968, then-unknown English driver James Hunt recorded his first race win driving a Russell-Alexis Mk14 Formula Ford car. Hunt would return on 5 May 1969, this time driving a Motor Racing Enterprises entered Merlyn Mk11A, and recorded his second ever win.

By 1986, the RAC Motor Sports Association (MSA) was pressurising Bill Chesson to erect Armco barriers, but he refused to do so, on the grounds that they would be dangerous to the motorcycle-racing fraternity. When RAC MSA threatened to refuse him a new circuit permit, he put it up for sale. Tom Bissett bought the circuit.

From 2008 the new lease holder was the British Rallycross Champion Pat Doran. 

On 24–25 May 2014, Lydden Hill played host to the newly formed FIA World Rallycross Championship. The event was run under similar principles to the FIA European Rallycross Championship in the previous few years, but with the likes of Petter Solberg and Liam Doran being notable drivers competing in the championship.

The American Nitro Rallycross series raced at Lydden Hill to begin the 2022–23 season on 18–19 June. Lydden Hill is the first track to host Nitro RX outside North America.

European rallycross returns 

The opening round of the 2009 FIA European Rallycross Championship (ERC) brought top flight Rallycross back to Lydden Hill. The last European Rallycross event at Lydden Hill Race Circuit was hosted in 1996. As all kind of things can change over a period of 12 years time, at least one thing didn't change ... After being declared winner of the 1996 European event at Lydden in the main Division, multiple champion Kenneth Hansen (Citroën C4) cruised to victory again in Division 1 on Easter Monday (13 April).

When ERC returned at the end of May 2010, Norwegian Sverre Isachsen (Ford Focus ST), celebrated his first victory in the European Championship as he beat multiple champion Kenneth Hansen (Citroën C4) and local guy Liam Doran  (Citroën C4) in the Division 1 'A' final.

About 13,500 people spent Easter 2011 at Wootton, attending the opening round of the 2011 ERC. Specially for the Norwegian fans among them it was a great weekend as the victories in all of the three racing categories went to Norway. Sverre Isachsen (Ford Focus Mk2) was on the highest step of the SuperCars podium on Monday afternoon. Before already Andreas Bakkerud (Renault Clio Mk2) and Lars Øivind Enerberg (Ford Fiesta ST RWD) did the same in the Super1600 and Touring Cars classes.

There were no first qualifying heats on day 1 of the opening round of the 2012 ERC as problems with the start systems made the Clerk of the Course decide to run the first heat on Monday. Therefore, the 2012 championship started in a similar way as previous year's championship ended when at Sosnová in the Czech Republic during the final round the first heats also had to be postponed until the other day. With the absence of defending champion Sverre Isachsen the door is now open for last year's runner-up Tanner Foust (Ford Fiesta Mk7) to start the season with a victory.

The opening round of the 2013 FIA European Rallycross Championship was held over the Easter holiday, at Lydden Hill, with victory going to the American Tanner Foust in his Ford Fiesta for the second year running, only after reigning ERC champion Timur Timerzyanov for dropped back with a punctured tyre.

World Rallycross Championship

In 2014, the FIA World Rallycross Championship arrived in Kent for Round Two. Ford Olsbergs MSE driver Andreas Bakkerud won, after a near perfect run. Robin Larsson claimed the runner’s-up spot in his Audi A1 Supercar, with Britain’s Andrew Jordan ending the event third in front of his home crowd.

Rallycross track records 

 Martin Schanche, (Ford RS200 E2) drove 3 ½ laps (1 lap = 1,400 m) in 2:28.8 Minutes during the 1990 FIA ERC round
 Sverre Isachsen, (Ford Focus T16 4X4), drove 4 laps (1 lap = 1,400 m) in 3.13.344 minutes during the 2009 FIA ERC Round

Current events

Major events 
FIA World Rallycross Championship
FIA European Rallycross Championship
MSA British Rallycross Championship
Lord of Lydden, the revival in 2013
BHP Performance Show
Lydden Hill Truck Festival
Nitro Rallycross

Local meetings 
South East Motor Sport Enthusiasts Club (SEMSEC)
Tunbridge Wells Motor Club (TWMC)
Rochester Motor Club (RMC)
British Automobile Racing Club (BARC)
Vintage Motorcycle Racing Club (VMCC)
Classic Racing Motorcycle Club (CRMC)
Car, Bike & Drifting Trackdays

Major race results

European rallycross

+ ran in conjunction with the British Rallycross Grand Prix

FIA World Rallycross

References

External links

 Lydden Race Circuit home page
 Rallycross history with information on Lydden (in German)
  A spectators guide for the Lydden Hill Race Circuit 

McLaren Group
Sports venues in Kent
Motorsport venues in England
City of Canterbury
World Rallycross circuits